Nicole Providence Fosse  (born March 24, 1963) is an American actress and dancer. She is the only daughter of Gwen Verdon and Bob Fosse.

Career 
Fosse appeared in Miami Vice in the role of Lani Mueller and played Kristine in the film version of A Chorus Line.

She has participated in productions involving her parents, including All That Jazz directed by her father, the 2009 Broadway revival of her father's musical revue Dancin'  and the biographical miniseries Fosse/Verdon (2019). For her work as co-executive producer on the latter, she received a nomination for the Primetime Emmy Award for Outstanding Limited Series.

Fosse/Verdon 
Fosse served as a creative consultant and co-executive producer of Fosse/Verdon (2019), which depicted the romantic and creative partnerships of her parents. In working for the eight-part biographical mini-series, Fosse noted that aside from sharing facts and the emotional experiences of living with her famous parents, she also became more cognizant of what actually occurred during the years that the creative duo were together. In an interview, Michelle Williams, who played Gwen Verdon, said one of the most complicated dilemmas in Verdon's life was the long gap in her career as she stayed home to take care of her daughter. The series also depicts how Bob Fosse's girlfriend, Ann Reinking, taught young Nicole ballet, endearing herself to her mother, becoming part of the family in the process.

Personal life 
Fosse's husband, stagehand Andreas Greiner, died in 2000. She has three adult sons.

Filmography

Film

Television

References

External links 
 
 
 
 

1963 births
Living people
20th-century American actresses
20th-century American dancers
21st-century American actresses
21st-century American dancers
American female dancers
American film actresses
American musical theatre actresses
American television actresses